Galeodidae is a family of solifuges, first described by Carl Jakob Sundevall in 1833.

Genera
, the World Solifugae Catalog accepts the following nine genera:
 Galeodes Olivier, 1791
 Galeodopsis Birula, 1903
 Galeodumus Roewer, 1960
 Gluviema Caporiacco, 1937
 Othoes Hirst, 1911
 Paragaleodes Kraepelin, 1899
 Paragaleodiscus Birula, 1941
 Roeweriscus Birula, 1937
 Zombis Simon, 1882

References

Solifugae
Arachnid families